Anybody Killa has released six studio albums: five on Psychopathic Records, one on Slangtown Records, and a re-release on his own label, Native World Inc. He has also released one EP and one greatest hits album on Psychopathic Records. He has released seven other EPs on his own record label, Native World Inc.

Albums

Studio albums

Extended plays

Mixtapes

Compilations

Valentine's Day singles

Halloween singles

Christmas singles

4/20 singles

Group albums

Krazy Klan

Dark Lotus

Psychopathic Rydas

Drive-By

Tha Hav Knots (2014–present)

Eastside Ninjas

Guest appearances

Original contributions to compilations

Music videos

References 

Hip hop discographies